Ayşenur is a Turkish feminine given name, and may refer to:

 Ayşenur Alpaslan (born 1953), Turkish diplomat and former ambassador
 Ayşenur Duman (born 1999), Turkish Olympian cross-country skier
 Ayşenur İslam (born 1958), Turkish university lecturer and politician
 Ayşenur Taşbakan (born 1982), Turkish taekwondo coach and former practitioner
 Ayşenur Zarakolu (1946–2002), Turkish author, publisher and human rights advocate

Turkish feminine given names